USRC Dexter was the name of more than one ship of the United States Revenue Cutter Service, and may refer to:

, a cutter in commission from 1830 to 1841
, a cutter in commission from 1874 to 1908

See also
 

United States Coast Guard ship names